Ilie Nico Baicu (born 5 December 1974) is a Romanian former footballer who played as a left back for teams such as Dacia Mioveni, FC Argeș Pitești or FC Vaslui. He made 116 appearances in Liga I.

References

External links
 
 
 Ilie Baicu at frf-ajf.ro

1974 births
Living people
People from Argeș County
Romanian footballers
Association football defenders
Liga I players
Liga II players
CS Mioveni players
FC Argeș Pitești players
FC Vaslui players
FC Internațional Curtea de Argeș players